Stephen William John Kelly (born 13 April 2000) is a Scottish footballer who plays as a midfielder for Scottish Premiership club Livingston.

Club career
Kelly signed a three-year contract with Rangers on 13 September 2018, and less than two weeks later made his professional debut when he came on as a substitute in a Scottish League Cup win over Ayr United on 26 September. He was loaned to Ayr United in July 2019, then spent the 2020-–21 season on loan at Scottish Premiership side Ross County.

On 12 January 2022, Kelly joined EFL League Two side Salford City on loan for the remainder of the 2021–22 season. He made his club debut as a second-half on 15 January in a league match against Bradford City. His full debut came three days later in a match against Port Vale.

Kelly moved on a permanent basis to Livingston in September 2022 for an undisclosed fee.

International career
Kelly has represented Scotland at under-17, under-19 and under-21 international levels.

Career statistics

References

External links

2000 births
Living people
People from Port Glasgow
Footballers from Inverclyde
Scottish footballers
Association football midfielders
Rangers F.C. players
Ayr United F.C. players
Ross County F.C. players
Salford City F.C. players
Scottish Professional Football League players
English Football League players
Scotland youth international footballers
Scotland under-21 international footballers
Livingston F.C. players